Lari Constituency is an electoral constituency in Kenya, located forty kilometers from Nairobi along the Nairobi-Nakuru highway (A104 road). Lari is located in the Western part of Kiambu County. The constituency was established in 1966. Lari borders Kinangop to the North, Limuru to the South, Githunguri and Gatundu North constituencies to the east and Naivasha Constituency to the west. Lari is one of the 12 sub-counties in  Kiambu County, and is further divided to five wards each electing a representative to the Kiambu County Assembly.

According to the 2009 Census Lari has a population of 123,895 people. The constituency is predominantly rural. The main towns in the area are Kijabe, Kinale, Kimende and Nyambari.

History 
The name Lari is derived from the Maasai language meaning "the place of green grass". During the 19th century Lari was a reserve grazing ground for the Maasai Community, with pasture available throughout the year. The Maasai would frequent the area, which is located at the foot of the Great Rift Valley to graze their cattle during the dry season.

Lari Constituency was created in 1966 after the first Kenyan Senate and House of representatives merged to form the National Assembly. The constituency was established as a special seat for the then Kiambu Senator J M Koinange. He was made the first Lari MP with no elections being held.

Night of the Long Knives

Lari features prominently in the history of Kenya's fight for independence. On 26 March 1953, Mau Mau combatants attacked and killed about 100 loyalists in the area in what came to be known as the 'Night of the long Knives'. Among the fatalities were Chief Luka, a local chieftain, and 97 other loyalists, including 13 members of Chief Luka's immediate family. 
This attack was followed by retaliation from colonial troops (including the King's African Rifles), with revenge attacks on the local population that killed about 400 people. Many of these people were buried in Kereita Forest, which is the site of a mass grave.

Geography 

Lari has a total area of 439.20 square Kilometers. The area is largely mountainous. Part of Lari lies on an escarpment of the Great Rift Valley between Gitithia and Kijabe locations. The highest point in the constituency is Rukuma, which is on the Nairobi-Nakuru Road, at an altitude of 1,400m.

Lari is largely forested, with Uplands Forest, Kireita Forest, Kinale forest, Kamae forest and parts of the large Kikuyu Escarpment Forest found in the area. The area is relatively cold because of its location on the windward side of the Aberdare Range. As a result, it receives a considerable amount of rainfall per year.

Administrative units 

In the national government Lari is a District with its administrative offices in Kimende Township. Its further divided into 22 locations.

Under the County Government of Kiambu, Lari a sub-county headed by a Sub-County administrator. Lari is further divided into 5 Wards: Lari/Kirenga, Kijabe, Kamburu-Kamuchege, Kinale and Nyanduma Wards. Kimende Township is a minor town in the area.

Economic activities 
Majority residents of Lari practice agriculture as the main source of livelihood, with the area dominated by subsistence farming. Tea farming is largely practiced by residents of the eastern part of Lari. this areas include Kagwe, Kagaa, Gatamaiyu and Matimbei areas.
Crops grown for sale include vegetables such as cabbage, coriander, spinach and kale (sukuma wiki). Vegetable farming in the constituency is largely favored by the large amounts of rainfall received throughout the year and the continuous cold seasons.

There are two major markets for vegetables in the constituency; Soko Mjinga Market and Nyambari Godown Sukuma Wiki Market. Both markets supply approximately 1,500 bags of kale per day to the major towns in Kenya. Lorries also ferry tonnes of cabbage from Kinale location daily to various towns in Kenya.

Lari also produces majority of the pears found in Kenya, with most of the crop grown in Nyambari, Gitithia, Githirioni, Kirenga, Kimende and Kambaa locations.

Many farmers in the area rear dairy cows. While the milk is produced mainly for personal consumption, the surplus is sold, usually to dairy cooperatives that have local offices in Lari. There are four milk processing plants in the area: Sundale Dairy Products in Uplands, Green Land Dairy in Nyambari, Kinale Milk processing Plant in Kinale, and Uplands Dairy and food processors [Pascha] in [Kagwe]

Industry 
There are a number of industries engaged in processing primarily agricultural products locally produced in Lari, such as the Farmers Choice Bacon Factory in Uplands, and the dairy processing plants for the milk produced in the area. Additionally, the Carbacid Kenya Plant was established to mine naturally existing carbon dioxide in the area.

Civil society 
Lari is the home to a number of community-based organizations. The Kijabe Environment Volunteers (KENVO), a voluntary community-based organization based in Kimende Township, is engaged in developing sustainable nature conservation programs in the Kikuyu Escarpment Forest.
The Naitera Community Empowerment Programme is another community-based organization, based in Nyambari Town, that aims to preserve the community's cultural heritage including preservation and management of environment through active community participation. Naitera operates across the wider Kiambu County where it advocates for good public management and accountability through Civic education as an avenue of promoting democracy and good governance.

Infrastructure 
The Mombasa - Kampala railway passes through the constituency. Lari has two railway substations; Uplands Substation and Matathia Substation.
The Nairobi - Nakuru Highway (A104 road) cuts across the constituency starting from Nyambari Shopping Center connecting Kimende and exiting at Soko Mjinga Vegetable Market. Lari also has 3 other major roads Uplands - Githunguri road, Kimende - Kagwe - Githunguri road and Gichiengo - Kijabe road. Most roads are not tarmacked. 
Bathi Dam, located in Kijabe Ward is the major supplier of water within the constituency. The dam also supplies water to Nairobi.

Hospitals 
The Kijabe Mission Hospital is the largest private health facility in the area, located in Kijabe Town.
Lari Health Center is the largest government health institution in the constituency, located at Rukuma Shopping Center in Lari/Kirenga Ward

Tourism

Rift Valley viewpoint
The Lari section of the escarpment is the highest point of the Great Rift Valley along the Nairobi-Nakuru Highway. This area of the escarpment gives tourists a good view of the Great Rift Valley with a view of the Longonot Crater, Suswa Hills and the escarpments of the Great Rift Valley.

The forest
Kerieta/Kamae forests are part of the great aberdare forests that are gazetted forest reserves and is home to a number of elephants, which can be seen along the Flyover - Gatundu road. The Kereita Cave and Waterfall are located in Kereita Forest at the southernmost end of the Aberdares range. The forest is a designated Important Bird Area. One of these trails, the Carbacid trail, leads to Kereita Waterfall on the Gatamaiyu River, and the adjacent cave that is home to a small bat colony.

Zip lining and forest lounge 
The Zipline  is a Six-line course for zip liners called The Colobus Monkey located in Kereita Forest is currently the second longest in Africa — 2.4 km long and 92m high. The world-class zip-lines installed and operated by Flying Fox, have a carrying capacity of a maximum of 115 kilograms and are operated under European Union safety. regulations The forest activities are managed African Forest Lodges that offer other services including mountain biking, archery, paintballing, tree planting and climbing and a Restaurant within the forest.

Politics 
Lari has for a long time voted separately from other constituencies in Kiambu and Central Province. Since the start of multiparty democracy in 1992 Lari has never voted for a Member of Parliament from the same party as the siting president despite winning with the presidential vote in 2002 and 2007. However, in 2013 Kenya Elections Hon. Mburu Kahangara became the first Member of Parliament to be elected in Lari while belonging to the same party as the sitting president since 1992.

Members of Parliament 
Elections for the Members of Parliament for Lari Constituency have been held since the constituency was gazetted in 1966.

County Assembly Wards 
Lari has five wards. each ward elects a representative to the Kiambu County Assembly. Currently all the Five representative are from Jubilee Party. The ruling party of Kenya.

References 

Constituencies in Kiambu County
Constituencies in Central Province (Kenya)
1966 establishments in Kenya
Constituencies established in 1966